Charles C. Edwards (September 16, 1923 – August 7, 2011) was an American physician who served as Commissioner of Food and Drugs from 1969 to 1973 and as the United States Assistant Secretary for Health from 1973 to 1975. He died on August 7, 2011, in San Diego, California at age 87.

References

External links 

 

1923 births
2011 deaths
20th-century American physicians
Commissioners of the Food and Drug Administration
Nixon administration personnel
Ford administration personnel
Physicians from California
Members of the National Academy of Medicine